The women's 200 metre breaststroke swimming competition at the 2002 Asian Games in Busan was held on 3 October at the Sajik Swimming Pool.

Schedule
All times are Korea Standard Time (UTC+09:00)

Records

Results

Heats

Final

References 

2002 Asian Games Report, Page 220
Results

Swimming at the 2002 Asian Games